Sad Happy is the fourth studio album by British indie rock band Circa Waves. The album was released as a double album with "Happy" being released on 10 January 2020 and "Sad" being released on 13 March 2020.

Critical reception
Sad Happy was met with universal acclaim reviews from critics. At Metacritic, which assigns a weighted average rating out of 100 to reviews from mainstream publications, this release received an average score of 82, based on 4 reviews.

Track listing

Charts

References

2020 albums
Circa Waves albums